Angelo Nannoni (1715- 30 April 1790) was an Italian surgeon and author of medical treatises.

Angelo was born in Florence, and by age 16 began his studies of anatomy and surgery at the hospital of Santa Maria Novella. In 1747, he visited Paris and Rouen. Returning to Florence, he espoused less complex pharmacologic compounds. He modified the strategy of cataract extraction proposed by Jacques Daviel. His son, Lorenzo Nannoni, was also a prominent surgeon.
 
Among his published works were: 
Trattato sopra i mali delle mammelle Florence, 1746
Della semplicita del medicare Venice, 1761
Ricerche critiche sopra lo stato presente della chirurgia by Samuel Sharp, translated from English, Siena, 1774
Memoria sul l'aneurisma dlla piegatura del cubito Florence, 1784
Dissertazione chirurgiche, cioe della fistola lagrimale; delle cataratte, de meciantis ex siccantibus; de medicantis causticis Paris, 1748

References

1715 births
1790 deaths
18th-century Italian writers
18th-century Italian male writers
18th-century Italian physicians
Italian surgeons
People from Florence